Faisal Karim (born 21 December 1981) is a Pakistani boxer. He competed in the men's light welterweight event at the 2004 Summer Olympics.

References

1981 births
Living people
Pakistani male boxers
Olympic boxers of Pakistan
Boxers at the 2004 Summer Olympics
Place of birth missing (living people)
Boxers at the 1998 Asian Games
Asian Games competitors for Pakistan
Light-welterweight boxers